Samsung Galaxy A5 refers to three Samsung Galaxy Android smartphones released in the 2010s.

These are:
Samsung Galaxy A5 (2015); Android smartphone released in December 2014.
Samsung Galaxy A5 (2016); Android smartphone released in December 2015.
Samsung Galaxy A5 (2017); Android smartphone released in January 2017.